Barbuda-East is a village and enumeration district on the island of Barbuda.

Demographics 
Barbuda-East has one enumeration district, ED 90500.

References 

Populated places in Antigua and Barbuda
Major Division of Rest of Barbuda